Guaichane-Mamuta is a volcano in Chile. It is formed by a caldera and lava flows which form two separate systems. The volcano is of Miocene age.

The other half, southeast of Mamuta, is the Guaichane half and is constructed by four different units of andesite-basaltic andesite lava flows; these include Cerro Churicoyo, Cerro Colorado, Cerro Guaichane and Cerro Limpire.()

Guaichane-Mamuta is constructed on the mid-Miocene Altos de Nama formation, which is formed by ignimbrites. Mamuta itself was also the origin of ignimbrites. Older pyroclastics from the same centre contain phenocrysts of clinopyroxene, olivine, orthopyroxene and plagioclase.

Mamuta is a volcano among a group of Miocene age stratovolcanoes on the western slope of the Andes. These are usually only partially eroded, although preferential erosion of the volcanos' central parts can cause the appearance of erosion calderas.

Three ages have been obtained on Mamuta, 8.8±0.5, 9.1±0.6 and 14.5 million years ago. The younger ages are considered more reliable. The older date was obtained on the Mamuta caldera. Ages obtained on Guaichane are 11.3±0.5 and 10.2±0.8 million years ago.

References

Sources 

 

Miocene calderas
Calderas of Chile
Volcanoes of Chile